Heinar Kipphardt (8 March 1922 - 18 November 1982) was a German writer. He came to prominence with the documentary theatre during the 1960s.
He is best known for  In the Matter of J. Robert Oppenheimer, a dramatization of the Oppenheimer security hearing.

Awards
 Schiller Memorial Prize (1962)
 Grimme-Preis (1965)

References 

1922 births
1982 deaths
German male writers